Sunnyside Gardens is a community within Sunnyside, a neighborhood in the New York City borough of Queens. The area was the first development in the United States patterned after the ideas of the garden city movement initiated in England in the first decades of the twentieth century by Ebenezer Howard and Raymond Unwin, specifically Hampstead Garden Suburb and Letchworth Garden City.

Covering  between Queens Boulevard and Sunnyside Yard, Sunnyside Gardens was constructed between 1924 and 1928 by the City Housing Corporation, founded by developer Alexander Bing, and architects Clarence Stein and Henry Wright. The project grew out of discussions in the early 1920s about housing and planning; Lewis Mumford was a leading participant. It is among the first planned communities in the U.S.

Sunnyside Gardens is listed as a historic district on the National Register of Historic Places. The New York City Landmarks Preservation Commission has also designated it as an official city landmark district.

Description
Sunnyside Gardens was built between 1924 and 1928, roughly taking up 16 blocks, with more than 600 buildings. It has 12 courts, which are known as Carolin Gardens, Colonial Court, Hamilton Court, Hamilton Court Apartments, Harrison Place, Jefferson Court, Lincoln Court, Madison Court North and South, Monroe Court Apartments, Phipps Garden Apartments I, Phipps Garden Apartments II, Roosevelt Court, Washington Court, and the Wilson Court. Sunnyside Gardens is in the northwestern part of Queens. Clarence Stein and Henry Wright served as the primary architects and planners for this development (Frederick L. Ackerman designed some of the mews houses), and the landscape architect was Marjorie Sewell Cautley.

Sunnyside Gardens includes one-, two-, and three-family homes, and a few apartment buildings, all made of Hudson brick. Each private residence has a small front garden facing the street and a private garden in the rear. The rental units in the two- and three-family houses enjoy private terraces overlooking the gardens. There are two configurations: the courtyard condition and the mews condition; at the edges of the community some homes simply line the street, with a common walkway running the length of the row. Homes in the courtyard blocks enclose an inner courtyard that was designated a common, landscaped but not used for recreation. Each homeowner actually owned, and paid taxes on, the part of the common in the block and lot, even if it was not used. The mews houses face a common front court and back on alleys; each mews house also has a private rear yard. This model allowed for denser residential development, while also providing ample open/green-space amenities.

As an amenity for the residents, the City Housing Corporation reserved lots on the northern edge of the development (abutting the Sunnyside Yard) for one of only two private parks in the city, the other being Gramercy Park.

History
The area was the first development in the United States patterned after the ideas of the garden city movement initiated in England in the first decades of the twentieth century by Ebenezer Howard and Raymond Unwin, specifically Hampstead Garden Suburb and Letchworth Garden City. Covering 77 acres between Queens Boulevard and the Sunnyside Railroad Yards, Sunnyside Gardens was constructed between 1924 and 1928 by the City Housing Corporation, founded by developer Alexander Bing, and architects Clarence Stein and Henry Wright. The project grew out of discussions in the early 1920s about housing and planning; social critic Lewis Mumford and economist Richard T. Ely were leading participants.

In the early years of the Great Depression, nearly 60 percent of the residents lost their homes to foreclosure. Those difficult years saw organized resistance by residents who forcefully resisted efforts by city marshals to evict families. The character of Sunnyside Gardens was protected by 40-year easements which protected the integrity of the courtyards and common walkways and controlled changes to the exterior of every property, extending to even paint color. Those covenants lapsed in the mid-1960s, and some homeowners rushed to claim their property, erecting fences into the middle of some courtyards. In response, in 1974 the Department of City Planning designated Sunnyside Gardens a special planned community preservation district, together with Fresh Meadows, Parkchester, and the Harlem River Houses. With that designation came rules protecting the inner courts and landscaping, and prohibiting driveways and curbcuts, rear sheds, and additions.

Landmark designations 
The Sunnyside Gardens Historic District is a national historic district that includes 66 contributing buildings and 12 contributing sites. It was listed on the National Register of Historic Places in 1984 and as a city historic district in 2007.

In 2003, a grassroots movement started to request designation as a New York City Historic District, in response to lack of protection for the historic character of the homes in the neighborhood. The campaign was contentious and garnered publicity in major news outlets, including WNYC and the New York Times.   On April 17, 2007, the New York City Landmarks Preservation Commission (NYCLPC) held a public hearing on the neighborhood, which was controversial, with 60 people speaking in favor and 25 against the designation. This was documented on New York Public Radio in a segment called "Cloud Over Sunnyside?". On June 26, 2007, the NYCLPC voted to designate the community. The designation prevents most major work from being done without consultation with the NYCLPC.

See also
 List of New York City Designated Landmarks in Queens
 National Register of Historic Places listings in Queens, New York

References

External links
A Fact Sheet for Residents from the NYC Department of City Planning, Queens Office dated June 2002
WNET Channel 13 profile of Sunnyside Gardens
July 23, 2003 Article about Landmarks Meeting
Queens Buzz Sunnyside Queens cultural web magazine

Neighborhoods in Queens, New York
Historic districts on the National Register of Historic Places in Queens, New York
New York City designated historic districts
New York City Designated Landmarks in Queens, New York
Historic districts in Queens, New York
Planned communities in the United States
Sunnyside, Queens